Rancho la Mezcalera is a rural inactive settlement 2 kilometers northeast of the town of San Jerónimo, Jalisco, Mexico. The means "the mezcal-pertained ranch" or "the Mezcalera Ranch".

External links
Mapa de Referencia - Rancho la Mezcalera

Populated places in Jalisco
Mezcal